Palaeopsephurus is an extinct genus of paddlefish in the Acipenseriformes family Polyodontidae.  At present the genus contains the single species Palaeopsephurus wilsoni.

The genus is known primarily from the Late Cretaceous (Maastrichtian) aged Hell Creek Formation of Montana. Palaeopsephurus is one of two extinct paddlefish genera to have been found in the North American fossil record, with the other genus and species Crossopholis magnicaudatus having been described and found in the Early Eocene Green River Formation.  A third extinct genus Protopsephurus with the single species Protopsephurus liui was described from China in 1994.  Only two modern paddle fish species are known, Polyodon spathula in the Mississippi River System of North America, and the extinct Psephurus gladius in the Yangtze River of China.

History and classification
The genus was described from three partial specimens currently residing in the collections of the University of Michigan Museum of Paleontology in Ann Arbor, Michigan, USA. Specimen number 22206 U.M. is a complete and well preserved skull with some denticles, pectoral girdle and pectoral fins. The second and third specimens were found in a block of matrix from the same location as 2226 U.M.. Specimen 22207 U.M. is a portion of the caudal region of a paddlefish, while 22208 U.M. is a partial shoulder with associated pectoral fin. While the specimens were found close to each other, it is impossible to determine if they represent a single individual, and as such were described as three separate fish specimens.

The Palaeopsephurus specimens were first studied by American paleontologist and ichthyologist Archie Justus MacAlpin.  He published his detailed 1947 type description in the journal Contributions from the Museum of Paleontology, University of Michigan.

References 

Polyodontidae
Monotypic fish genera
Prehistoric ray-finned fish genera
Cretaceous bony fish
Turonian genus first appearances
Maastrichtian genus extinctions
Late Cretaceous fish of North America
Hell Creek fauna
Fossil taxa described in 1947